The Passage Company of the Foreign Legion of Saigon was a logistics handling operation of the French Foreign Legion, in Cochinchina, and based at fort de Cay May. In 1950, the CPLE of Saigon counted (years where the units of the Legion in Indochina amounted to 20,000 men) 21,389 passengers of all ranks, the company also registered 14 tons of baggage and almost 125,000 letters transmitted. 

Passengers passing by Fort of Cay May would find numerous services available to them on base. There was a lobby (with a lounge area and a small sundries shop), an Information Center, a library, a Literacy Center that taught reading and writing, a barber shop, sports fields, and a 500-seat cinema. The CPLE, which depended on the military base of Saigon, received a satisfactory rating for the company's action during the French withdrawal. The unit was dissolved on October 31, 1955.

Insignia 
Silver rectangle bordered by green and red stripes, at the center, on a geographical map representing the southern part of Indochina. A grenade with 7 flames with a green filled bomb and red flames surrounded by gold, on which is featured the inscription « C.P.L.E », in golden letters; at the bottom, a ship at sea; at the top a quadrimotor aircraft. The grenade with 7 flames and the green and red are the symbols of Legion; the ship and the plane evoke the vocation of the unit; the grenade placed on southern Indochinese part of the map indicated the precise garrison of the unit. The insignia was created in 1948.

See also 
 French Foreign Legion Music Band (MLE)
 Armored Train of the Foreign Legion
 5th Heavy Weight Transport Company
 Disciplinary Company of the Foreign Regiments in the Far East

References

Sources 
Centre de documentation de la Légion étrangère

Units of the French Foreign Legion
Company sized units
Military logistics units and formations
Military units and formations established in 1947
Military units and formations disestablished in 1955